Wolthausen is a village (Ortsteil) in the municipality of Winsen (Aller) in the district of Celle in the north German state of Lower Saxony. It lies on the River Örtze in the Aller valley and on the B 3 federal road.

Politics 
Wolthausen has a joint council with the neighbouring village of Stedden.

The council chair is Christian Peters (CDU).

External links 
 Official website of Winsen (Aller)

Villages in Lower Saxony
Winsen an der Aller